Zhou Jie (born 5 August 1970) is a Chinese actor and singer, best known for his works on two television series as Fu Erkang in the My Fair Princess trilogy and as Yang Kang in The Legend of the Condor Heroes (2003).

Early life and education 
Zhou was born in Xi'an, Shaanxi, on 5 August 1970, while his ancestral home in Shandong. After graduating from Shanghai Theatre Academy in 1993, he was despatched to the National Theatre Company of China.

Acting career 
Zhou made his film debut in Stanley Kwan's biographical film Center Stage, playing Liu Qiong. 

In 1998, he was cast in the role for which he is best known, the character of Fuk'anggan on the television My Fair Princess, adapted from Taiwanese novelist Chiung Yao's novel Princess Pearl. He reprised his role in My Fair Princess 2 (1999) and My Fair Princess 3 (2003). 

Zhou portrayed Bao Zheng in Hu Mingkai's historical television series Young Justice Bao (2000), opposite Ashton Chen, Ren Quan, and Li Bingbing.

In 2003, he co-starred with Li Yapeng, Zhou Xun and Jiang Qinqin in the wuxia television series The Legend of the Condor Heroes, based on the novel by the same name by Hong Kong novelist Jin Yong.

Zhou played Wong Tai Sin, the lead role in Trail of the Everlasting Hero, a wuxia-fantasy television series adaptation based on Ge Hong's Biographies of the Deities and Immortals.

In 2006, he starred as King Wu of Zhou in the television series adaption of Xu Zhonglin's book, Investiture of the Gods.

In 2019, he had a small role in Old Herbalist Doctor, which starred Chen Baoguo, Feng Yuanzheng, Xu Qing, and Chen Yuemo.

Filmography

Film

Television

References

External links
Official site 心有千千杰 --- Xin You Qian Qian Jie

Male actors from Shaanxi
1970 births
Living people
Male actors from Xi'an
Shanghai Theatre Academy alumni
Musicians from Xi'an
Singers from Shaanxi
20th-century Chinese male actors
21st-century Chinese male actors
Chinese male stage actors
Chinese male film actors
Chinese male television actors
21st-century Chinese male singers